Orthaga fumida is a species of snout moth in the genus Orthaga. It is found on Sumatra.

References

Moths described in 1901
Epipaschiinae
Endemic fauna of Indonesia